In organic chemistry, a nitrone is a functional group consisting of an N-oxide of an imine. A nitrone is a 1,3-dipole, and is used in 1,3-dipolar cycloadditions. Other reactions of nitrones are known, including formal [3+3] cycloadditions to form 6-membered rings, as well as formal [5+2] cycloadditions to form 7-membered rings.

Generation of nitrones 
Nitrones are generated most often either by the oxidation of hydroxylamines or condensation of monosubstituted hydroxylamines with carbonyl compounds (ketones or aldehydes). The most general reagent used for the oxidation of hydroxylamines is mercury(II) oxide.

Carbonyl condensation methods avoid issues of site selectivity associated with the oxidation of hydroxylamines with two sets of (alpha) hydrogens.
A significant problem associated with many reactive nitrones is dimerization. This issue is alleviated experimentally by employing an excess of the nitrone or increasing the reaction temperature to exaggerate entropic factors.

Reactions

1,3-dipolar cycloadditions 

As 1,3-dipoles, nitrones are useful in 1,3-dipolar cycloadditions. Upon reaction of a nitrone with an alkene dipolarophile, an isoxazolidine is formed:

See also
 N-Oxoammonium salt
 Nitronate

References 

Functional groups